The 1975 Brazil–West Germany nuclear agreement is a treaty between Brazil and West Germany signed on June 27, 1975.

Negotiations 
The first round of negotiations were conducted trilaterally between Brazil, West Germany, and France.

In April 1975, the United States sent a four‐person delegation to the negotiations to lobby for safeguards to prevent Brazil using the technology or plutonium to make nuclear weapons.

The agreement was signed by foreign ministers  and Hans-Dietrich Genscher on June 27, 1975 in Bonn, West Germany.

Reactions 
During a visit to West Germany in 1977, Vice President of the United States Walter Mondale lobbied the West German government to withdraw from the deal.

Brazil 
The Brazilian Physical Society issued a statement that disagreed with the premise that Brazil required a nuclear program of that magnitude, given its vast hydroelectric capacity.

References

Citations

Bibliography 

  
  
 

1975 in Brazil
1975 in West Germany
1975 treaties
Nuclear technology in Germany
Nuclear technology in Brazil